Snow-Walker is a trilogy written by author Catherine Fisher. The book is presumably set in the Dark Ages of a fictional region in Scandinavia, as the story often heavily refers to Norse mythology. The story is mainly about the sorceress Gudrun, who rules the Jarl's people through fear; the power struggle between her and her son, her very reflection and one weakness; and the small, motley band of outlaws who join him in the fight to restore the land to its rightful leader.

Characters 
 Gudrun – a beautiful, but evil, sorceress from the northern kingdom of the Snow-Walkers. It is said that the Jarl before Ragnar sent an army to attack her people, but it failed when the army marched into a strange mist and never returned. One man, Ragnar from Hvinir, came back, and with him he brought Gudrun. They got married, and Gudrun subsequently ruled through fear and sorcery until the son whom she had banished would return. She can cause pain, twist minds, and steal souls out of living men. It is said that her reflection, Kari, shall destroy her.
 Jessa "Two-Knifes" Horolfsdaughter – the daughter of a Wulfing warrior that was killed in the rebellion against Ragnar. A courageous young woman with a stubborn streak and an infamously bold tongue. The story is mainly told through her point of view as it follows the outlaws' journey.
 Thorkil Harraldsson – Jessa's cousin and companion on her journey to Thrasirshall. Like Jessa, he, too, was banished because of father's involvement with the rebellion against Ragnar. A fussy young man with a taste for finery, often he tries, and fails, to serve as the voice of reason for his hot-tempered cousin. He appears in the first book only, and is briefly mentioned in the second.
 Kari Ragnarsson – the son of Gudrun and Ragnar. As a small child, his mother kept him in a cold dungeon, resulting in inability to speak, run, or even think. At age six, he was banished to Thrasirshall with Brocheal Gunnarsson. It was there that Brocheal taught him how to live by showing him love and kindness, allowing him to grow into a soft-spoken, gentle young man. Because of this, the two are inseparable. For years, however, Gudrun let rumours run, and soon the people believed him to be a monster. In reality, Kari is simply his mother's reflection; they look exactly alike and have the very same powers, but just like a reflection, they are complete opposites. He is often accompanied by two large ravens known as Thought and Memory.
 Skapti Arnsson – Wulfgar's mischievous friend. He is first seen as a peddler that assisted in the escape of Wulfgar Osricsson. He is revealed as a skald later, and an old friend of Brocheal Gunnarson and Kari Ragnarsson that has been providing them with food.
 Brochael Gunnarsson – a large, red-haired man that was exiled by Ragnar. As further punishment, he was assigned to be Kari's caretaker. He becomes extremely attached to the boy, almost acting as a father to him.
 Wulfgar Osricsson – the last member of the Wulfings, a family that had always been in line for the throne until Ragnar was unfairly named. With the help of Kari, Jessa, and a small group of rag-tag outlaws, he takes his rightful place as Jarl.
 Hakon – a former thrall (a Norse slave), who is freed after he helps save the Jarlsrealm in the second book. He is easily frightened and has a rather nervous disposition, but can be brave and stout-hearted when the time calls for it. Hakon is good friends with Jessa, as well as Kari despite the fact that he is slightly afraid of him. Slowly learning the skills of a warrior, his sword is called Dream-Breaker after it prevents him from dying, much like it did in a dream that he had in the third book. After a terrifying encounter with Gudrun, one of his hands becomes utterly useless. Because of this, many refer to him as Hakon Empty-Hand.

Novel series